The Falls of St. Anthony is an 1880 oil landscape painting by the Hudson River School artist Albert Bierstadt. Rather than depict the falls with the spillway, Bierstadt depicted them as they appeared prior to human interference. The painting depicts in its foreground several Native Americans, and a hatted figure with a walking stick, speculated to be Louis Hennepin, discoverer of the falls.

References

Paintings by Albert Bierstadt
1880 paintings
Water in art
Native Americans in art